Delftlanden is a neighbourhood in the city Emmen in Drenthe, the Netherlands.

References 

Populated places in Drenthe
Emmen, Netherlands